Store Styggedalstind, is the fourth-highest summit in Norway, located within the Hurrungane mountains, which are part of the Jotunheimen mountain range.  The mountain is located in the eastern part of the municipality of Luster in Vestland county, Norway.  This mountain is directly between the mountains Sentraltind and Jervvasstind.

There are two summits on Store Styggedalstind:

Name
The first element of the name is the genitive form of the valley name Styggedalen and the last element is the finite form of tind which means "mountain peak'. The name of the valley is a compound of stygg which means "ugly" or "bad" and the finite form of dal which means "dale" or "valley".

Climbing
The ascent is relatively challenging.  There are three possibilities, in increasing order of difficulty:
 Climb via Jervvasstind (Norway's 12th-highest peak), originating in Skogadalsbøen
 Traverse the Jervvassbreen glacier and climb from there
 Climb all the peaks from Store Skagastølstind (Norway's third highest peak at ) across to the summit—the so-called Styggedal traverse.  It is a multi-day trek across Store Skagastølstind, Vetle Skagastølstind (18th-highest peak at ), Sentraltind (13th-highest peak at ), the eastern and then western summits of Styggedalstind, and then descending from Jervvasstind (12th-highest peak at )—bagging 6 of Norway's 20 tallest peaks in one trip.

See also
List of mountains of Norway

References

Luster, Norway
Mountains of Vestland
Jotunheimen